Kimberley is an electoral district of the Legislative Assembly of Western Australia, located in the state's far north and named after the Kimberley region. The electorate has one of the highest Aboriginal enrolments of any seat in the Parliament.

The seat has been held by the Labor Party since 1980—inclusive of one term under a Labor independent (1996–2001), but has become increasingly marginal in recent years. It saw an extremely close and almost unprecedented four-way race at the 2013 state election, with relatively small primary vote margins separating the Labor, Liberal, National and Green candidates in a result that was not known for several days. However, Labor candidate Josie Farrer was able to hold the seat for Labor, winning the seat on Green preferences. In the 2021 state election Divina D'Anna retained the seat for Labor.

History 
First created for the 1904 state election, the district was a combination of two former seats: East Kimberley and West Kimberley. Its first member, Francis Connor, was one of four independents who opted to support the Labor Party's minority government under Premier Henry Daglish. The government fell a year later, and a conservative member won the seat. It was then held for 19 years by non-Labor parties until a split in the Country Party saw Labor gain the seat at the 1924 state election. Labor held the seat continuously for 44 years until losing it to the Liberal Party at the 1968 state election.

The seat became the focus of controversy at the 1977 state election. A significant turnover in voters had occurred, with 1,750 voters including many Aboriginals being entitled to vote for the first time. The Labor Party endorsed Ernie Bridge, an Aboriginal businessman and president of the Shire of Halls Creek, against the sitting member, Liberal Minister for Lands Alan Ridge. Ridge won the vote but it was successfully challenged in the Court of Disputed Returns on 7 November due to claims of irregular treatment of Aboriginal voters at polling stations and various other concerns, and a by-election was called for 17 December 1977. However, Ridge won the vote on a decreased voter turnout and an increased majority.

At the 1980 state election, Ernie Bridge won the seat. In 1986, Bridge became a minister in the Labor government—the first Aboriginal cabinet minister in any Australian government. In 1996, Bridge resigned from the Labor Party and was re-elected at the 1996 state election as an independent before retiring at the 2001 state election. His successor was Carol Martin, the first Aboriginal woman elected to an Australian parliament.

Three out of five of the Indigenous Australians that have entered the Western Australian parliament have originated from this seat.

Geography
Named for the Kimberley region, the electorate is the state's northernmost.  The district has a long coastline, being bounded by the Indian Ocean to its north and west.  To the east, it is bounded by the Northern Territory border, whilst its southern boundaries are those of local government areas. The district includes four local government areas: Shire of Wyndham-East Kimberley, Shire of Broome, Shire of Derby-West Kimberley, Shire of Halls Creek, all of them in their entirety. Its major population centres include Broome, Derby, Fitzroy Crossing, Halls Creek, Kununurra and Wyndham. It also includes the eastern parts of the Shire of East Pilbara, to the east of the Canning Stock Route.

Members for Kimberley

Election results

References

External links
 ABC election profiles: 2005 2008
 WAEC district maps: current boundaries, previous distributions

Kimberley
1904 establishments in Australia
Electoral district
Constituencies established in 1904